The Jelai River is a 97.14 km long river in  Pahang, Malaysia.

See also
 List of rivers of Malaysia

References

Rivers of Pahang
Rivers of Malaysia